Tessa Laurie Holyoake,  (17 March 1963 – 30 August 2017) was a Scottish haematology-oncology physician. She specialised in chronic myeloid leukaemia (CML), and discovered its stem cell. She was considered a world leading expert in leukaemia research.

Early life and education
Tessa Holyoake was born in Aberdeen, Scotland on 17 March 1963. She attended Albyn School. She studied medicine at the University of Glasgow, and graduated in 1985. She completed her PhD at the Beatson Institute for Cancer Research in Glasgow.

Career and research
After specialising in oncology, she worked from 1992 to 1996 as a clinical research fellow at the Cancer Research Campaign's laboratories in Glasgow. From 1996 to 1998, she worked at Terry Fox Laboratory in Vancouver and discovered that primitive stem cells in CML existed in a quiescent state, and therefore they did not respond to cell cycle-active agents like imatinib.

In 1999, she returned to Glasgow Royal Infirmary and in 2004, became Professor of Experimental Haematology, and Director of the Paul O'Gorman Leukaemia Research Centre.  In 2005, she first presented work showing that a combination of imatinib or dasatinib with a farnesyl transferase inhibitor was better at eradicating CML stem cells, which was published in 2007.

She developed a drug treatment to target the abnormal CML stem cell, to go beyond the current lifelong tyrosine kinase inhibitor treatment.

Awards and honours
 Scottish Health Awards Cancer Care Award, 2009 
 Fellow of the Royal Society of Edinburgh, 2007 and recipient of the Royal Medal in 2017 
 Lord Provost of Glasgow Health Award, 2011 
 Fellow of the Academy of Medical Sciences, United Kingdom, 2013
 Scottish Alba Saltire Society Fletcher of Saltoun Award, 2015
Scottish Cancer Foundation Inaugural Prize, 2015
 Evans/Forrest Medal, 2015
 Rowley Prize (International Chronic Myeloid Leukemia Foundation), 2017
 Fellow of the Royal College of Pathologists
 Fellow of the Royal College of Physicians

Personal life
Tessa Holyoake was married to Andy, a general practitioner; they had no children. She enjoyed mountain biking, hill walking, and kayaking, and fundraised for the Leukaemia Research Centre by cycling and climbing Munros.

In addition to her research work, she continued a clinical practice as a consultant at the Beatson West of Scotland Cancer Centre in Glasgow.

On 31 August 2017, she died of metastatic breast cancer near Loch Tummel, Perthshire. The disease had been diagnosed in 2016.

References

External links
Interview on stem cell research, 2014 YouTube, 2:48min

1963 births
2017 deaths
People educated at Albyn School
Scottish medical researchers
Scottish women medical doctors
Scottish women scientists
Alumni of the University of Glasgow
Academics of the University of Glasgow
Fellows of the Royal Society of Edinburgh
Fellows of the Academy of Medical Sciences (United Kingdom)
Cancer researchers
British oncologists
Women oncologists
Fellows of the Royal College of Physicians
Fellows of the Royal College of Pathologists
Scottish women academics